The Germany women's national 3x3 team is a national basketball team of Germany, governed by Deutscher Basketball Bund (DBB). It represents the country in international 3x3 (3 against 3) women's basketball competitions.

Throughout 2021, the team had continuous leaps in performance and celebrated several tournament victories at the highest level. As of 2021/2022, the team has been first place in the world according to the FIBA rankings.

History

2019
At the 2019 European Games in Minsk the team, led by Satou Sabally, finished 4th.

In summer 2019, long-time Germany women's national team player and captain Svenja Brunckhorst started with 3×3 basketball. 
Brunckhorst had started her career at TSV 1880 Wasserburg. The Point guard also played in Spain and France during her career, but she was most successful in her hometown of Wasserburg, where she contributed to six league titles between 2008 and 2016.

Sonja Greinacher agreed at the same time with her constant companion since the youth selections at the DBB.

2020
Brunckhorst, Stefanie Grigoleit, Theresa Simon and WNBA reinforcement Satou Sabally almost managed to qualify for the Olympic premiere. However, they failed in a strong preliminary round group against France and the USA. Yet, the good performances at the 2021 FIBA 3x3 Women's Olympic Qualifying Tournament boosted public attention.

2021
At the 2021 FIBA 3x3 Europe Cup, the Team Germany finished 2nd. The team consisted of Svenja Brunckhort, Luana Rodefeld, Katharina Müller and Sonja Greinacher, all of whom had benefited from the Bundeswehr’s top-level sports promotion which had also enabled Brunckhorst to get a Master's degree in international management. Never before had a German Basketball Federation women's selection been so successful. Noteworthy was that the event featured high profile competition as numerous Euroleague and WNBA players showed up. In the final, the German selection ceded 12–16 Spain.

The team was further reinforced by former and current national team and Damen-Basketball-Bundesliga players Stefanie Grigoleit, Ama Degbeon, Theresa Simon and Jennifer Crowder.

In November 2021, Greinacher and Brunckhorst returned to Germany's "regular" basketball national team in order to compete at the EuroBasket Women 2023 qualification.

World Cup record

Head coach position
Matthias Weber – (2021)

See also
Germany women's national basketball team
Germany men's national 3x3 team

References

External links

3x3
Women's national 3x3 basketball teams